Marc Kamoun (born 7 November 1937) is a French former swimmer. He competed in the men's 4 × 200 metre freestyle relay at the 1960 Summer Olympics.

References

External links
 

1937 births
Living people
Olympic swimmers of France
Swimmers at the 1960 Summer Olympics
Sportspeople from Algiers
French male freestyle swimmers
21st-century Algerian people